Black Beauty is a 1933 American pre-Code drama film directed by Phil Rosen and starring Esther Ralston, Alexander Kirkland and Gavin Gordon. It is one of a number of adaptations of Anna Sewell's 1877 novel Black Beauty, with the setting moved from Victorian Britain to a plantation in Virginia.

Cast
 Esther Ralston as Leila Lambert 
 Alexander Kirkland as Henry Cameron 
 Gavin Gordon as Captain Jordan 
 Hale Hamilton as Harlan Bledsoe 
 Don Alvarado as Renaldo 
 George Walsh as Junk Man 
 Theodore Lorch as Bledsoe, the Veterinary 
 John Larkin as Eph 
 Eddie Fetherston as Reporter 
 Al Bridge as Hack Driver 
 Bruce Covington as Doctor

References

Bibliography
 Goble, Alan. The Complete Index to Literary Sources in Film. Walter de Gruyter, 1999.

External links
 

1933 films
1933 drama films
American drama films
Films directed by Phil Rosen
Monogram Pictures films
Films set in Virginia
Films based on British novels
American black-and-white films
1930s English-language films
1930s American films